W. Rudolph Johnson (July 1, 1931 – August 12, 2008) was an American politician. He served as a Democratic member for the 72nd district of the Georgia House of Representatives.

Life and career 
Johnson was born in Fulton County, Georgia. He attended Forest Park High School and Atlanta Law School.

Johnson was mayor of Lake City, Georgia. He was a member of the Georgia House of Representatives, representing the 72nd district, serving until 1988.

Johnson died in August 2008, at the age of 77.

References 

1931 births
2008 deaths
People from Fulton County, Georgia
Democratic Party members of the Georgia House of Representatives
20th-century American politicians
Atlanta Law School alumni